Rheinkomet (= Rhine Comet) is a light art installation on top of the Rheinturm (Rhine Tower) in Düsseldorf. It was first introduced on the 70th anniversary of the federal state North Rhine-Westfalia in August 2016. It has 56 Xenon arc lamps. It was first intended only for the anniversary. Due to high public popularity, they try to set it up permanently and to use it on special occasions.

References

External links 
 .
 .
 AO Lighting Installs Searchlights For Rhine Comet For Düsseldorf. Webseite im Portal livedesignonline.com

Buildings and structures in Düsseldorf
Light art